= Sialkot mosque bombing =

2004 Terrorist attack in Sialkot

Coordinates: 32°29′52″N 74°32′45″E

- Date: 1 October 2004
- Attack type: Car bombing
- Weapon: Improvised explosive device
- Deaths: 31

On 1 October 2004, a bombing at the Zainabia mosque in Sialkot, Punjab, Pakistan, killed 31 people and injured dozens of others. Hundreds of Shia Muslims were attending Friday prayers in the mosque at the time. The improvised explosive device was hidden in a briefcase and exploded in the centre of the prayer hall. A second bomb weighing about twelve kilograms was found in a briefcase and defused by a bomb disposal squad.

== Bombing ==
Before the explosion, witnesses identified a "youth carrying a briefcase" entering the mosque. At 1:25p.m. PKT (8:25a.m. UTC), an explosive device was set off in the mosque hall, instantly killing 16 people and injuring dozens. The explosion left a 0.60 meter (2 ft) deep crater and shattered windows on nearby buildings. Fifteen injured victims later died of their injuries.

After the explosion, two unidentified individuals threw another briefcase at the entrance of the mosque and fled. The briefcase had 12kg of explosive material, which was defused by a bomb disposal squad.

== Aftermath ==
On 1 and 2 October, there were riots in Sialkot in response to the bombing. Shia rioters set fire to a police station and the mayor's office. They looted shops and gas stations and damaged dozens of vehicles. In response, the Army deployed troops to the city and firefighters attended.
